Vâlcele is a commune in Covasna County, Transylvania, Romania composed of four villages:
Araci / Árapatak (the commune center)
Ariușd / Erősd
Hetea / Hetye
Vâlcele

The commune is situated in the south-western part of Covasna County, 17 km from  Sfântu Gheorghe, at the foot of the Baraolt Mountains.  The Olt River passes through the southern part of the commune.

Demographics

Vâlcele has an ethnically mixed population. According to the 2011 census, it has a population of 4,292, of which 48.3% or 2,071 are Roma, 39.4% or 1,689 are Romanians and 9.9% or 427 are Székely Hungarians. 100 people, or 2.3%, belong to other ethnicities.

Natives
 Romulus Cioflec

References

Communes in Covasna County
Localities in Transylvania
Romani communities in Romania